In enzymology, a phosphate acetyltransferase is an enzyme that catalyzes the chemical reaction

acetyl-CoA + phosphate  CoA + acetyl phosphate

The substrates of this enzyme are acetyl-CoA and phosphate, whereas its two products are CoA and acetyl phosphate.

This enzyme belongs to the family of transferases, specifically those acyltransferases transferring groups other than aminoacyl groups.  The systematic name of this enzyme class is acetyl-CoA:phosphate acetyltransferase. Other names in common use include phosphotransacetylase, phosphoacylase, and PTA.  This enzyme participates in 3 metabolic pathways: taurine and hypotaurine metabolism, pyruvate metabolism, and propanoate metabolism.

Structural studies

References

 
 
 

EC 2.3.1
Enzymes of known structure